Ust-Yuguz (Ust-Ügeź) is a rural locality (a village) in Zaimkinsky Selsoviet, Duvansky District, Bashkortostan, Russia. The population was 86 as of 2010. There are 4 streets.

Geography 
Ust-Yuguz is located 94 km northwest of Mesyagutovo (the district's administrative centre) by road. Ust-Ayaz is the nearest rural locality.

References 

Rural localities in Duvansky District